Albrecht von Croÿ (born 1959 in Mülheim an der Ruhr, North Rhine-Westphalia) is a German and journalist. He is managing editor of the Handelsblatt since 1 August 2003.

He worked for the Frankfurter Allgemeine Zeitung from 1989 until he became one of the founders of the TELEBÖRSE in 1999. In 2002 he was appointed to a position at the DMEuro in Frankfurt, a newspaper owned by the Verlagsgruppe Handelsblatt.

External links
Albrecht Prinz von Croy neuer Redaktionsdirektor des Handelsblatt - Presseportal: Verlagsgruppe Handelsblatt GmbH

German newspaper editors
German male journalists
German journalists
German newspaper journalists
German business and financial journalists
20th-century German journalists
21st-century German journalists
German princes
Albrecht
1959 births
Living people
Frankfurter Allgemeine Zeitung people